West Carrollton City School District is the school district serving Miami Township, Moraine, and West Carrollton, Ohio with an enrollment of over 3800 students.

Schools
Walter Shade Early Childhood Center
C.F. Holliday Elementary
Frank Nicholas Elementary
Harry Russell Elementary
Harold Schnell Elementary
West Carrollton Middle School
West Carrollton High School

See also
List of school districts in Ohio

External links
West Carrollton Schools

Education in Montgomery County, Ohio
School districts in Ohio